The Venice Commission, officially European Commission for Democracy through Law, is an advisory body of the Council of Europe, composed of independent experts in the field of constitutional law. It was created in 1990 after the fall of the Berlin Wall, at a time of urgent need for constitutional assistance in Central and Eastern Europe.

Creation 
The idea to create a Commission for Democracy through Law as a group of experts in constitutional law was conceived by the then Minister for Community Policies of Italy, Antonio Mario La Pergola. The election of the name was based on the theory of La Pergola that expressed that sustainable democracies could only be built in a constitutional framework based on the rule of law.

The formal proposal for the creation of the commission was made by the Italian Minister of Foreign Affairs, Gianni De Michelis, who invited the other Foreign Affairs ministers of the Council of Europe to the Conference for the Creation of the European Commission for Democracy through Law that was held at the Giorgio Cini Foundation in San Giorgio Maggiore, Venice from 31 March to 1 April 1989. At this meeting, Foreign Affairs and Justice ministers reunited with representatives of the Constitutional Courts of the 21 countries of the Council of Europe.

The committee of ministers, seeking to assist the countries of Central and Eastern Europe, approved the creation of the Commission as a partial agreement at the session in Venice from 19 to 20 January 1990. The Foreign Affairs and Justice Ministers of Bulgaria, Czechoslovakia, Hungary, Poland, the German Democratic Republic, Romania, the Soviet Union and Yugoslavia also participated as observers in this meeting.

On 10 May 1990 ministers from 18 countries (Austria, Belgium, Cyprus, Denmark, Finland, France, Greece, Ireland, Italy, Luxembourg, Malta, Norway, Portugal, San Marino, Spain, Sweden, Switzerland and Turkey) of the Council of Europe adopted the statute of the Commission.

Member states

Starting with 18 member states, soon all member states of the Council of Europe joined the Venice Commission and since 2002 non-European states can also become full members. As of 13 July 2014, the Commission counts 60 member states – the 47 member states of the Council of Europe and 13 other countries. Belarus is an associate member and there are five observers. The Palestinian National Authority and South Africa have a special co-operation status similar to that of the observers. The EU, OSCE/ODIHR and IACL/AIDC (International Association of Constitutional Law / ) participate in the plenary sessions of the Commission.

Members

The members are "senior academics, particularly in the fields of constitutional or international law, supreme or constitutional court judges or members of national parliaments". Acting on the Commission in their individual capacity, the members are appointed for four years by the participating countries. The current and former members include,
amongst other notable academics and judges:
 Ugo Mifsud Bonnici (Professor of Law and former President of Malta),
 Talija Chabrieva, Russian jurist, author of the 2020 amendments to the Constitution of Russia
 Jean-Claude Colliard (Chancellor of University Paris 1 - Panthéon-Sorbonne, former member of the Constitutional Council),
 Christoph Grabenwarter (Judge at the Constitutional Court of Austria),
 Wolfgang Hoffmann-Riem (Former Judge, Federal Constitutional Court of Germany),
  (Professor at University of Oslo),
 Hanna Suchocka (Former Prime Minister of Poland, Professor at Adam Mickiewicz University in Poznań and Chair of the Constitutional Law Department)
 Gret Haller (Senior Lecturer at Johann Wolfgang Goethe University, Germany, former President of the Swiss Parliament),
 Klemen Jaklič (Lecturer on Law at Harvard Law School, Harvard University),
 Cármen Lúcia Antunes Rocha (Professor at Pontifical Catholic University of Minas Gerais, Judge of Supreme Federal Court of Brazil),
 Jeffrey Jowell (Professor of Law and former Dean of University College London),
 Philip Dimitrov (Former Prime Minister of Bulgaria, Member of the Constitutional Court of Bulgaria), 
 Kaarlo Tuori (Professor of Jurisprudence at the University of Helsinki),
 Pieter van Dijk (State Councillor, Chair of the Constitutional Law Committee, and former Judge of the European Court of Human Rights),
  (Professor at University of Antwerp)

Leadership
Jan Erik Helgesen, a professor at the University of Oslo, was president of the Commission for several years, through to 2009, later becoming 1st Vice-President. From December 2009 to December 2021, Gianni Buquicchio held the presidency. , Claire Bazy-Malaurie has been president since December 2021.

Thomas Markert became Secretary General of the Commission. The Secretary General heads the Commission's secretariat at the Council of Europe's headquarters in Strasbourg.

The main focus of the work of the Venice Commission is on draft constitutions and constitutional amendments but the Commission also covers para-constitutional law, i.e. laws which are close to the Constitution, such as minority legislation or electoral law.

Requests for opinions come from the participating states and the organs of the Council of Europe or international organisations or bodies participating in the Venice Commission's work. The opinions adopted by the Commission are not binding but are mostly followed by member states.

The areas of the Commission's activities are as follows:

Democratic institutions and fundamental rights 
The Venice Commission's primary task is to assist and advise individual countries in constitutional matters in order to improve functioning of democratic institutions and the protection of human rights. Already in 1991 the Commission helped in creating the first democratic Constitution of Romania since 1947. In 2012, in an invited Opinion, the Venice Commission expressed several criticisms of church-related legislation in Hungary.

Working method
The working method adopted by the Commission when providing opinions is to appoint a working group of rapporteurs (primarily from amongst its members) which advises national authorities in the preparation of the relevant law. After discussions with the national authorities and stakeholders in the country, the working group prepares a draft opinion on whether the legislative text meets the democratic standards in its field and on how to improve it on the basis of common experience. The draft opinion is discussed and adopted by the Venice Commission during a plenary session, usually in the presence of representatives from that country. After adoption, the opinion becomes public and is forwarded to the requesting body.

Non-directive approach
Although its opinions are generally reflected in the adopted legislation, the Venice Commission does not impose its solutions, but adopts a non-directive approach based on dialogue. For this reason the working group, as a rule, visits the country concerned and meets with the different political actors involved in the issue in order to ensure the most objective view of the situation.

Conflict resolution by providing legal advice
A political agreement settling a conflict should be supported by a viable legal text. It may also be possible for an agreement on a legal text to foster a political solution. For this reason the Venice Commission pays particular attention to countries which are going through or have gone through ethno-political conflicts.
In this context, at the European Union's request, the Venice Commission has played an important role in developing and interpreting the constitutional law of Bosnia and Herzegovina, North Macedonia, Serbia and Montenegro as well as that of Kosovo. It has also been involved in efforts to settle the conflicts on the status of Abkhazia and South Ossetia in Georgia and Transnistria in Moldova.

The Commission drafts opinions, initiates studies and organises conferences inter alia on:
 
 Constitutional reform 
 Emergency powers
 Federalism and regionalism
 International law issues
 Internal security services and armed forces
 Protection of fundamental rights including the freedom of religion, the freedom of assembly and association
 Protection of minorities and prohibition of discrimination
 Functioning of parliaments and judiciary

Elections, referendums and political parties
The work of the Commission in the field of elections, referendums and political parties is steered by the Council for Democratic Elections (CDE). The CDE is made up of representatives of the Venice Commission, the Parliamentary Assembly of the Council of Europe (PACE) and the Congress of Local and Regional Authorities of the Council of Europe. The aim of the Council for Democratic Elections is to ensure co-operation in the electoral field between the Venice Commission as a legal body and the Parliamentary Assembly and the Congress of the Council of Europe as political bodies in charge of election observation, in order to promote the European common values in this field – the principles of the European electoral heritage.

The Commission identifies and develops standards in the area of elections through:

 Codes of good practice on elections, on referendums and on political parties
 Opinions - mostly joint ones with OSCE/ODIHR - on electoral legislation
 Workshops for Central Election Commissions (CEC) and Courts
 Assistance missions to CECs and legal advice to the PACE
 "Vota" database of electoral legislation

Constitutional and ordinary justice
Another branch of the Commission's activities includes co-operation with the constitutional courts and equivalent bodies. Since its creation, the Venice Commission has been aware that it is not sufficient to assist the states in the adoption of democratic constitutions but that these texts have to be implemented in reality. Key players in this field are constitutional courts and equivalent bodies exercising constitutional jurisdiction.

Cooperation with Constitutional Courts, ordinary courts and ombudspersons is done by means of:

 Opinions on and for Constitutional Courts, ordinary courts and for Ombudspersons (including amicus curiae briefs and amicus ombud opinions) 
 Leading constitutional case-law – bulletin and CODICES database 
 Regional co-operation with Courts outside Europe 
 World Conference on Constitutional Justice  
 Seminars and conferences with Constitutional Courts 
 Venice Forum – advice and exchange between Constitutional courts
 Joint Council on Constitutional Justice (representatives of Courts and members of the Commission)

Transnational studies, reports and seminars
The Commission's transnational activities enable it to carry out the main duties laid down in its Statute, which are to improve the functioning of democratic institutions, knowledge of legal systems and understanding of the legal culture of countries working with it.

While most of the work of the Commission is country specific, the Commission also prepares, through its own initiative and at request of outside bodies such as the Parliamentary Assembly of the Council of Europe, studies and reports addressing topics of general interest in the member and observer states. Transnational topics are also covered in the Unidem seminars (University for Democracy) and published in the Science and Technique of Democracy collection.

Comparative studies
Comparative studies on topics to do with the functioning of democracy offer initial overviews of the law in various countries. Such a comparative approach then makes it possible to identify constitutional values that are shared throughout Europe and, where relevant, any areas of weakness. The third stage is that of harmonisation, in which, on the basis of Commission recommendations, the principles concerned are incorporated into the law of those countries where they have not yet been established.

UniDem (University for Democracy) seminars
The UniDem seminars bring leading specialists from the political and academic worlds and constitutional courts (or equivalent bodies) and the Commission into contact with, for example, a specific university or constitutional court. Reports are presented on particular countries or specific aspects of the topics under discussion. By allowing exchanges between specialists from a variety of backgrounds, the UniDem seminars help to define the rules common to democratic states in which human rights and the rule of law are respected.

EU integration

In June 2022, the European Union asked the candidate countries of Ukraine and Moldova, and the applicant country of Georgia to implement various reforms suggested by the Venice Commission in order to proceed with EU integration.

Positions taken

Blasphemy
In 2009, the Venice Commission attracted rare news coverage for its opinion that "blasphemy should not be illegal".

Elections: boundary delimitation

As part of its report, European Commission for Democracy Through Law: Code of Good Practice in Electoral Matters, Guidelines and Explanatory Reports adopted October 2002, the Venice Commission recommended a number of considerations, also when dealing with issues of boundary delimitation.

Report about Poland
In December 2017, after the Polish government attempted measures to reshape and control the Supreme Court of Poland, the Venice Commission published a report criticising those reforms.  The report prompted the European Union to invoke Article 7 of its founding treaty threatening Poland with losing its voting rights in the EU institutions.

Legislation on religious freedoms in Montenegro
Since 2015, the Venice Commission was included in process of legislative reform and regulation of various legal issues related to religious freedoms and rights of religious communities in Montenegro. First opinion of the VC on the initial draft law on freedom of religion in Montenegro, was issued in November 2015. It was followed by a prolonged period of internal consultations and additional deliberations in Montenegro, resulting in the creation of a new draft law, that was followed by another opinion of the VC, issued in June 2019, recommending various improvements and clarifications.

See also

 Constitutionalism
 Rule according to higher law

References

Further reading 

 Lauri Bode-Kirchhoff: Why the Road from Luxembourg to Strasbourg leads through Venice: the Venice Commission as a link between the EU and the ECtHR, in: Kanstantsin Dzehtsiarou et al. (eds.): Human Rights Law in Europe. The Influence, Overlaps and Contradictions of the EU and the ECHR, Routledge 2014, p. 55-72,

External links
 http://www.venice.coe.int
 http://www.codices.coe.int

Constitutional law
Council of Europe
 
Organizations established in 1990